There are many parks and open spaces in Greater London, England.

Green space in central London consists of five of the capital's eight Royal Parks, supplemented by a number of small garden squares scattered throughout the city centre. Open space in the rest of the region is dominated by the remaining three Royal Parks and many other parks and open spaces of a range of sizes, run mainly by the local London boroughs, although other owners include the National Trust and the City of London Corporation.

London is made of 40% public green space, including 3,000 parks and totaling 35,000 acres.

Royal parks

The centrepieces of Greater London's park system are the eight Royal Parks of London. Covering 1976 hectares (4,882 acres), they are former royal hunting grounds which are now open to the public.
 Richmond Park 955 ha (2,359.85 acres)
 Bushy Park 450 ha (1,112 acres)
 Regent's Park 197 ha (486.79 acres)
 Hyde Park 140 ha (346 acres)
 Kensington Gardens 111 ha (274 acres)
 Greenwich Park 73 ha (180 acres)
 St James's Park 34 ha (84 acres)
 Green Park 16 ha (39.5 acres)

Garden squares

Many of the smaller green spaces in central London are garden squares, which were built for the private use of the residents of the fashionable districts, but in some cases are now open to the public. Notable examples open to the public are Russell Square in Bloomsbury, Lincoln's Inn Fields in Holborn and Soho Square in Soho.

The Royal Borough of Kensington and Chelsea contains over a hundred garden squares whose use is restricted to residents. The upkeep of many of these spaces (also named for example Crescents, Gardens, Place) is paid for through a levy on top of residents' council tax.

Council parks

In addition to these spaces, a large number of council-owned parks were developed between the mid 19th century and the Second World War.

London Borough of Tower Hamlets
Victoria Park 86.18 ha (213 acres), 

London Borough of Wandsworth
Battersea Park 83 ha (205 acres).
London Borough of Lewisham

 Beckenham Place Park 96 hectares

London Borough of Bromley
Crystal Palace Park, South London 80 ha (200 acres)

Lambeth Council
Brockwell Park 51 hectares (126 acres)

London Borough of Haringey
Alexandra Park 80 ha (197.68 acres)
Tottenham Parks
 Bruce Castle park, Tottenham's oldest park.
 Lordship Recreation Ground
 Tottenham Marshes
 Tottenham Cemetery has park grounds.
 Downhills Park
 Chestnuts Park
 Down Lane Park, metropolitan park since 1907 with soccer fields, tennis courts, playground, an outdoor gym and a BMX track for cyclers.
 Markfield Park
 The Green (Tottenham)
 Brunswick Road Open Space
 Chapman's Green

 City of Westminster
 Grosvenor Square

Other green spaces

Other major open spaces in the suburbs include: 

They have a more informal and semi-natural character, having originally been countryside areas protected against surrounding urbanisation. Some cemeteries provide extensive green land within the city — notably Highgate Cemetery, burial place of Karl Marx and Michael Faraday amongst others. Completing London's array of green spaces are two paid entrance gardens — the leader is the Royal Botanic Garden at Kew, whilst the royal residence of Hampton Court Palace also has a celebrated garden. All Outer London boroughs contain sections of the metropolitan green belt.

Commons
There are over a hundred registered commons in London, ranging in size from small fragments of land to large expanses.

Lavender Fields

There are two historic lavender fields in the London Borough of Sutton. One, at Oaks Way, Carshalton Beeches is three acres in size and is run as a not-for-profit community project. The other, a 25-acre commercial site in Croydon Lane called Mayfield, is popular with tourists. Situated on the North Downs of Surrey, the locality is ideal for lavender cultivation, owing to the chalky free-draining nature of the soil. It was known as the "Lavender Capital of the World" from the 18th to the early 20th centuries, with global production of the plant centred here and blue fields dotting the area.

Greenways

There are several types of London greenways including The Greenway and the Thames Path.

By location

London National Park City
London was officially declared the world's first National Park City in July 2019. A National Park City is inspired by the family of National Parks but is not the same as a National Park: it is a “large urban area that is managed and semi-protected through both formal and informal means to enhance the natural capital of its living landscape". It is led by volunteers with a network of supporters and backing from councils' including the Mayor of London with activities linking to the Greater London Authorities' Environment Strategy.

The London National Park City was established by the National Park City Foundation [NPCF], which aims to inspire 25 National Park Cities around the world by 2025.

See also
List of Sites of Special Scientific Interest in Greater London
List of Local Nature Reserves in Greater London
Walking in London

References

External links
London Parks and Gardens Trust
London Landscape Architecture Visitors Guide
 Green-Spaces Guide to London
Green Spaces Near You in London
London National Park City